This article lists the squads for the 2010 FIFA U-20 Women's World Cup, held in Germany. Each competing federation was allowed a 21-player squad, which had to be submitted to FIFA no later than 25 June.

Group A

Germany
Coach:  Maren Meinert

Costa Rica
Coach: Randall Chacón.

Colombia
Coach:  Ricardo Rozo

France
Coach:  Jean-Michel Degrange

Group B

Brazil
Coach:  Marcos Gaspar

North Korea
Coach:  Kwang Sok Choe

Sweden
Coach:  Calle Barrling

New Zealand
Coach:  Tony Readings

Group C

England
Coach:  Mo Marley

Nigeria
Coach:  Ndem Egan

Mexico
Coach:  Roberto Medina

Japan
Coach:  Norio Sasaki

Group D

United States
Coach:  Jill Ellis

Ghana
Coach:  James Dadzie

Switzerland
Coach:  Yannick Schwery

South Korea
Coach:  Choi In-cheul

References

2010 Squads
2010 in youth association football